A bulbous bow is a protruding bulb at the bow (or front) of a ship just below the waterline. The bulb modifies the way the water flows around the hull, reducing drag and thus increasing speed, range, fuel efficiency, and stability. Large ships with bulbous bows generally have twelve to fifteen percent better fuel efficiency than similar vessels without them. A bulbous bow also increases the buoyancy of the forward part and hence reduces the pitching of the ship to a small degree.

Vessels with high kinetic energy, which is proportional to mass and the square of the velocity, benefit from having a bulbous bow that is designed for their operating speed; this includes vessels with high mass (e.g. supertankers) or a high service speed (e.g. passenger ships, and cargo ships). Vessels of lower mass (less than 4,000 dwt) and those that operate at slower speeds (less than 12 kts) have a reduced benefit from bulbous bows, because of the eddies that occur in those cases; examples include tugboats, powerboats, sailing vessels, and small yachts.

Bulbous bows have been found to be most effective when used on vessels that meet the following conditions:

The bulb design is optimised for the vessel's operating speed.

Underlying principle

The effect of the bulbous bow can be explained using the concept of destructive interference of waves:

A conventionally shaped bow causes a bow wave. A bulb alone forces the water to flow up and over it forming a trough. Thus, if a bulb is added to a conventional bow at the proper position, the bulb trough coincides with the crest of the bow wave, and the two cancel out, reducing the vessel's wake. While inducing another wave stream saps energy from the ship, cancelling out the second wave stream at the bow changes the pressure distribution along the hull, thereby reducing wave resistance. The effect that pressure distribution has on a surface is known as the form effect.

A sharp bow on a conventional hull form would produce waves and low drag like a bulbous bow, but waves coming from the side would strike it harder. The blunt bulbous bow also produces higher pressure in a large region in front, making the bow wave start earlier.

The addition of a bulb to a ship's hull increases its overall wetted area. As wetted area increases, so does drag. At greater speeds and in larger vessels it is the bow wave that is the greatest force impeding the vessel's forward motion through the water. For a vessel that is small or spends a great deal of its time at a slow speed, the increase in drag will not be offset by the benefit in damping bow wave generation. As the wave counter effects are only significant at the vessel's higher range of speed, bulbous bows are not energy efficient when the vessel cruises outside of these ranges, specifically at lower speeds.

Bulbous bows may be configured differently, according to the designed interaction between the bow wave and the countering wave from the bulb. Design parameters include:
 a) upward curvature (a "ram" bulb) versus straight forward (a "faired-in" bulb),
 b) bulb position with respect to the waterline, and
 c) bulb volume.

Bulbous bows also decrease a ship's pitching motion, when they are ballasted, by increasing the mass at a distance removed from the ship's longitudinal centre of gravity.

Development

Towing tests of warships had demonstrated that a below-water ram shape reduced resistance through the water before 1900. They were referred to as Germany's North Atlantic greyhounds, two large commercial ocean liners that competed for the trans-Atlantic passenger trade.

The design began to be incorporated elsewhere, as seen in the U.S. built SS Malolo, SS President Hoover and SS President Coolidge passenger liners launched in the late 1920s and early 1930s.  Still, the idea was viewed as experimental by many shipbuilders and owners.

In 1935 the French superliner  was designed by Vladimir Yurkevich combining a bulbous forefoot with massive size and a redesigned hull shape. She was able to achieve speeds in excess of 30 knots (56 km/h). Normandie was famous for many things, including her clean entry into the water and markedly reduced bow wave. Normandies great rival, the British liner , achieved equivalent speeds using traditional stem and hull design. However, a crucial difference was that Normandie achieved these speeds with approximately thirty per cent less engine power than Queen Mary and a corresponding reduction in fuel use.

Bulbous bow designs were also developed and used by the Imperial Japanese Navy. A far more radical bulbous bow design solution was incorporated into their massively large , including ,  and the aircraft carrier .

The modern bulbous bow was developed by Dr. Takao Inui at the University of Tokyo during the 1950s and 1960s, independently of Japanese naval research. Inui based his research on earlier findings by scientists made after Taylor discovered that ships fitted with a bulbous forefoot exhibited substantially lower drag characteristics than predicted. The bulbous bow concept was first definitively studied by Thomas Havelock, Cyril Wigley and Georg Weinblum, including Wigley's 1936 work "The Theory of the Bulbous Bow and its Practical Application" which examined the issues of wave production and damping. Inui's initial scientific papers on the effect of bulbous bow on wave-making resistance were collected into a report published by the University of Michigan in 1960. His work came to widespread attention with his paper "Wavemaking Resistance of Ships" published by the Society of Naval Architects and Marine Engineers in 1962. It was eventually found that drag could be reduced by about five per cent. Experimentation and refinement slowly improved the geometry of bulbous bows, but they were not widely exploited until computer modelling techniques enabled researchers at the University of British Columbia to increase their performance to a practical level in the 1980s.

Design considerations 
Bulbous bows embody the following defining characteristics:

 Length-wise shape
 Cross-section
 Length of forward projection 
 Position of the shape's axis (e.g. forward or upwards)

While the primary purpose of such bulbs is to reduce the power required to drive a vessel at its operating speed, their sea-keeping characteristics are also important. A ship's wave-making characteristics at its operating speed are reflected in its Froude number. A ship designer can compare the length at the water line for a design with and without a bulb necessary to power the vessel at its operating speed. The higher the speed, the bigger the benefit of the bulbous bow in diminishing the necessity for a longer water line to achieve the same power requirement. Bulbs typically are v-shaped on the bottom to minimise slamming in rough seas.

Sonar domes
Some warships specialised for anti-submarine warfare use a specifically shaped bulb as a hydrodynamic housing for a sonar transducer, which resembles a bulbous bow but the hydrodynamic effects are only incidental. The transducer is a large cylinder or sphere composed of a phased array of acoustic transducers. The entire compartment is flooded with water and the acoustic window of the bulb is made of fiber-reinforced plastic or another material (such as rubber) transparent to underwater sounds as they are transmitted and received. The transducer bulb places the sonar equipment at the greatest possible distance from the ship's own noise-generating propulsion system.

See also 
Axe bow #LEADGE-bow

Notes

References

Watercraft components
Fluid dynamics
Nautical terminology
Interference

de:Bug (Schiffbau)#Wulstbug